The 1927 All-Ireland Senior Football Championship was the 41st staging of Ireland's premier Gaelic football knock-out competition. Kildare were the winners. Ending Kerry's year.

Results

Connacht Senior Football Championship

An objection was made and a replay ordered.

[Match abandoned following a disputed goal for Mayo after 12 minutes. Sligo withdrew from the championship and Mayo were awarded the tie.]

An objection was made and a replay ordered.

Leinster Senior Football Championship

Munster Senior Football Championship

Ulster Senior Football Championship

All-Ireland Senior Football Championship

Championship statistics

Miscellaneous

 The Kilkenny GAA Grounds become known as Nowlan Park after former President James Nowlan.
 Leitrim win their first Connacht title.

References

All-Ireland Senior Football Championship